Jesper Brian Nøddesbo (born 23 October 1980) is a Danish-Norwegian former handball player.

He is European Champion by winning the 2008 European Men's Handball Championship in Norway with the Danish national team. He received a bronze medal at the 2006 European Men's Handball Championship, and again at the 2007 World Men's Handball Championship.

Nøddesbo was top scorer in the Danish Handball league in 2006.

References

External links

1980 births
Living people
Danish male handball players
Liga ASOBAL players
Olympic handball players of Denmark
Handball players at the 2008 Summer Olympics
Handball players at the 2016 Summer Olympics
FC Barcelona Handbol players
KIF Kolding players
Danish expatriate sportspeople in Spain
Expatriate handball players
People from Herning Municipality
Medalists at the 2016 Summer Olympics
Olympic gold medalists for Denmark
Olympic medalists in handball
Sportspeople from the Central Denmark Region